The  is a Japanese railway line in Yamagata Prefecture, Japan. It connects Akayu Station in Nanyō to Arato Station in Shirataka.

The Flower Nagai Line is the only line operated by the third sector , which took over the former JR East line in 1988.

In 2005, Yamagata Railway was in danger of having to shut down due to low patronage, leaving many residents, especially the young and old, without a mode of transportation from their farms. The only option available to the company was to try to attract more tourists to the scenic views. Lone train operator, Tatsuo Asakura, working without the knowledge of his superiors increased out-of-town passengers from 350 in 2005 to 7,000 in 2006, and in September 2008 had entertained more than 20,000 tourists with his uplifting guided tours, spoken in local dialect.

Operation

Rolling Stock

YR-880 Series
Eight single-car diesel multiple units were built by Niigata Transys in 1988 and 1990 for the Flower Nagai Line, using the Niigata Transys NDC model. Six units exist as of 2018. One unit, YR-881 has been scrapped in 2003, and YR-885 had been scrapped in 2015.

MCR4A Series
A snow blower car manufactured by Niigata Transys, one unit has been manufactured.

History
 October 26, 1913:  -  section opens
 November 15, 1914:  -  section opens
 December 11, 1922:  -  section opens
 April 22, 1923:  -  segment opens, completing the line
 November 15, 1954: Diesel multiple units replace steam engines on the line
 June 1, 1959: Miyauchi Station opens
 May 20, 1960: Minami-Nagai Station opens
 October 28, 1986: Government designates line for closure
 April 1, 1987: Line inherited by JR East following privatization of JNR
 October 10, 1988: Line transferred from JR East to Yamagata Railway Company
 December 15, 1989: Shirousagi Station opens
 October 23, 1997: Centralized traffic control (CTC) introduced
 June 9, 2002: Ayame-Kōen Station opens
 October 13, 2007: Shikinosato Station opens

Station list
All stations are located in Yamagata Prefecture.

References

External links

 

 
Railway lines opened in 1913
Rail transport in Yamagata Prefecture
1067 mm gauge railways in Japan
1913 establishments in Japan
Japanese third-sector railway lines